The 1912 Summer Olympics in Stockholm saw the fourth water polo tournament at Olympics. All games took place in the newly built swimming stadium in Djurgårdsbrunnsviken from 7 to 16 July 1912. All medals were decided by using the Bergvall system.

Medal summary

The competitions in water polo were arranged on the Cup Tie (elimination) system, but in such a way that the necessary number of matches had to be played for the second and third prizes between the teams qualified to take part in these rounds. The principle was adopted that a team which had not been beaten, direct or indirect, by a team that was qualified to fight for the second or third prize, should have the right to play against the team last-mentioned, even if it (the first-named) had already been beaten by some other team. The teams entered were drawn in pairs for the first round, after which the order in which they were to meet in the second round was determined by drawing lots, so that the order in which the games were to be played, right up to the final, was fixed before the games began.

Participating nations

A total of 45 water polo players from 6 nations competed at the Stockholm Games:

Bracket

Results

Main Tournament to Gold

Final standings

References

Sources
 PDF documents in the LA84 Foundation Digital Library:
 Official Report of the 1912 Olympic Games (download, archive) (pp. 1021–1024, 1031–1037)
 Water polo on the Olympedia website
 Water polo at the 1912 Summer Olympics (men's tournament)
 Water polo on the Sports Reference website
 Water polo at the 1912 Summer Games (men's tournament) (archived)

External links
 
 International Olympic Committee medal database

 
1912 in water polo
1912 Summer Olympics events
1912